is a railway station complex in the Tsuruhashi district of Ikuno-ku and Tennoji-ku, Osaka, Japan. It is served by the JR West Osaka Loop Line, the Kintetsu Nara Line, and the Osaka Metro Sennichimae Line.

Kintetsu Railway

This station has a stationmaster and administrates itself and Imazato Station.

Layout
The station on the Kintetsu lines has two island platforms serving four tracks on the second level. The platforms enable passengers to change trains between the Nara Line and the Osaka Line (cross-platform interchange).

Adjacent stations

History 
The Kintetsu platform featured what was once the smallest FamilyMart store in Japan. It closed down in June 2022.

West Japan Railway Company

This station has a stationmaster and administrates Teradacho, Momodani, Tamatsukuri and Morinomiya stations.

Layout
The station on the Osaka Loop Line has two side platforms serving two tracks on the third floor, over the western side of the platforms and tracks for the Kintetsu lines.

History 
Station numbering was introduced in March 2018 with Tsuruhashi being assigned station number JR-O04.

Osaka Metro Sennichimae Line

Layout
The station on the Sennichimae Line has an island platform serving two tracks on the second basement and fenced with platform gates.

Surrounding area
The surrounding area of Osaka is well known for its bulgogi (Korean-style barbecue) restaurants and other Korean goods. Many stalls selling Korean wedding dresses, bootleg items, fruits, vegetables, and kimchi are located under the tracks.

The Tsuruhashi and Ikuno-ku districts are well known for the large number of Zainichi Korean living there. Many families from Korea have lived in the Tsuruhashi district for three generations or more.

Establishments around the station
Miyukimori Shopping Street
Tsuruhashi Market
Osaka Red Cross Hospital (大阪赤十字病院)

Buses
Tsuruhashi-ekimae (Osaka City Bus)
Route 18: for Tamatsukuri via Uehommachi Rokuchome / for  via Miyukidori
Route 22: for Abenobashi via Uehommachi Rokuchome and Tennoji Kumin Center / for Suwa Jinja-mae via Tamatsukuri
Route 73: for Namba / for  via Katsuyama Yonchome and

See also
 List of railway stations in Japan

References

Ikuno-ku, Osaka
Osaka Metro stations
Osaka Loop Line
Railway stations in Japan opened in 1969
Railway stations in Japan opened in 1932
Railway stations in Japan opened in 1914
Railway stations in Osaka
Stations of West Japan Railway Company